Caggiano is a surname. Notable people with the surname include:

 Antonio Caggiano (1889–1979), Argentine Roman Catholic cardinal 
 Biba Caggiano, Italian-American cookbook author, television chef and restaurateur
 Emanuele Caggiano (1837–1905), Italian sculptor
 Fedele Caggiano (1804–1880), Italian sculptor
 Frank Caggiano (born 1959), American Roman Catholic bishop
 Jeremías Caggiano (born 1983), Argentine football striker 
 Pasquale Caggiano (1909–1972), American politician
 Rob Caggiano (born 1976), American guitarist and producer

Italian-language surnames